Autódromo La Chutana is a motorsport race track, situated in the San Bartolo District of Lima Province, south of Lima, and is the principal race track in this country. Subsequently, with the addition of a chicane on the main straight, the circuit was also used in a clockwise direction.

Additionally, at the beginning of 2013 a circuit of karts was inaugurated, where they perform competitions and exhibitions to the public.

Events
Since 2010, the  6 Horas Peruanas have been held at the La Chutana, one of the oldest long-term races in South America. In 2012, a new race called Los 200 km de Lima was created. Trackdays and autocross, piques and drifting championships are also held at La Chutana.

References 

La Chutana